Walani is a census town in Nagpur district in the Indian state of Maharashtra.

Demographics
 India census, Walani had a population of 10,716. Males constitute 53% of the population and females 47%. Walani has an average literacy rate of 75%, higher than the national average of 59.5%: male literacy is 80%, and female literacy is 69%. In Walani, 13% of the population is under 6 years of age.

References

Cities and towns in Nagpur district